Patrick V. Verkooijen (born May 21, 1969) is the CEO of Global Center on Adaptation, a Dutch foundation, which acts as the solutions broker to accelerate, innovate and scale adaptation action for a climate-resilient world. In this role he works closely with Ban Ki-moon, architect of the Paris Agreement as 8th Secretary-General of the United Nations and Chairman of the Board of GCA. He also managed the Global Commission on Adaptation chaired by Ban Ki-moon and co-led by Kristalina Georgieva and Bill Gates. Prior to this role, he was the World Bank Special Representative for Climate Change.

Education
Verkooijen holds a PhD in Sustainable Development Diplomacy from Wageningen University. He also achieved an MPA from Harvard University and a master's degree in Social and Political Philosophy from the University of Amsterdam. He has written academic papers focusing on sustainability and governance.

Career
In his current role at the Global Center on Adaptation, Verkooijen was the driving force behind the first ever Climate Adaptation Summit, hosted by the Netherlands in January 2021. During the Climate Adaptation Summit he convened the inaugural Ministerial dialogue on climate adaptation in January 2021. With the participation of newly appointed U.S. Special Presidential Envoy for Climate, John Kerry and Managing Director of the IMF, Kristalina Georgieva, the dialogue focused on how to accelerate efforts to build forward better from the Covid-19 pandemic. He also spearheaded the Groningen Science Declaration which saw five Nobel Laureates and over 3,000 global scientists call on world leaders, decision-makers and investors, to change the way we understand, plan and invest for a changing climate to ensure we limit future damage. In April 2021 he convened the Global Leaders Dialogue on the Africa Covid-Climate Emergency with the African Development Bank to launch the Africa Adaptation Acceleration Program with Dr Akinwumi Adesina. The Africa Adaptation Acceleration Program will mobilize $25 billion to scale up and accelerate climate change adaptation across Africa. The Dialogue attracted over 30 heads of state and global leaders committed to prioritize actions that help African countries adapt to climate change and build forward better.

Verkooijen also initiated the first-ever State and Trends in Adaptation report which collates information on the status and trends in adaptation globally and was well received by policy makers and practitioners.

Verkooijen is also focused on ensuring the next generation are educated on climate risks through his role as Chair of the Ban Ki-moon Climate Adaptation Programme at the University of Groningen. He has also been the Professor of Practice of Sustainable Development Diplomacy at the Fletcher School of Law and Diplomacy at Tufts University since January 2010.[12]  He regularly speaks in the global media about Climate change and Global warming.

From July 2012 Verkooijen was the World Bank Special Representative for Climate Change. He represented the World Bank in UN meeting on climate change and led the global effort to put a price on carbon ahead of the Paris Summit in 2015. As such, he mobilized support from leaders across the globe, including Chancellor Merkel of Germany and Prime Minister Trudeau of Canada, to commit to global goals to expand carbon pricing to cover 25 percent of global emissions by 2020, and achieve 50 percent coverage within the next decade.

As head of the World Bank's efforts on climate-smart agriculture, Verkooijen spearheaded, in close collaboration with Kofi Annan, the global effort to enhance the triple win of food security, adaptation and mitigation culminating in the adoption of agriculture as part of the UNFCCC and for the first time transforming agriculture from being part of the problem to being part of the solution to climate change.

Media coverage
Verkooijen is regularly published in global media outlets including The Guardian, The New York Times, The Washington Post, Reuters and CNN International, and has also appeared on Sky News, CNBC International, BBC and Newsweek.

See also
 Center for International Environment and Resource Policy
 United Nations Conference on Sustainable Development
 United Nations Framework Convention on Climate Change

References

1969 births
Living people
Dutch chief executives
The Fletcher School at Tufts University alumni
Wageningen University and Research alumni
Harvard Kennedy School alumni
University of Amsterdam alumni